Světlá Hora is a municipality in Bruntál District in the Moravian-Silesian Region of the Czech Republic. It has about 1,400 inhabitants.

Administrative parts
Světlá Hora is made up of villages Dětřichovice, Podlesí, Stará Voda, Suchá Rudná and Světlá.

History
The first written mention of the village of Světlá is from 1267. Dětřichovice was founded in 1268.

During some of the time of the Nazi German control of the region, a subcamp of Auschwitz III was located here: the town of Světlá was the location of the Lichtewerden labor camp, established on 11 November 1944.

Twin towns – sister cities

Světlá Hora is twinned with:
 Polska Cerekiew, Poland
 Rieste, Germany

References

External links

Villages in Bruntál District